Michelle Houts is an American author of picture and chapter books for children.

Personal life
Houts lives in Celina, Ohio.

Books
Sea Glass Summer (2019, Candlewick Press).
When Grandma Gatewood Took a Hike. (2016, Ohio University Press), biography of extreme hiker Emma Rowena Gatewood. Chosen as a School Library Journal Best Picture Book of 2016.
Kammie on First (2014, Ohio University Press), a biography of Dottie Kamenshek.
Winterfrost (2014, Candlewick Press)
Silent Swoop (2019, Dawn Publications)
Count the Wings: The Life and Art of Charley Harper (2018, Ohio University Press), biography of mid-century modern artist Charley Harper
Lucy's Lab, Book 1: Nuts About Science (2017, Sky Pony Press)
Lucy's Lab, Book 2: Solids, Liquids, Guess Who's Got Gas (2017, Sky Pony Press)
Lucy's Lab, Book 3: The Colossal Fossil Fiasco (2018, Sky Pony Press)
The Beef Princess of Practical County (2009, Random House, Delacorte Press)
The Practical County Drama Queen (2014, MuseItUp)

References

Living people
Children's non-fiction writers
American children's writers
American women children's writers
21st-century American women
Year of birth missing (living people)